Cipriani Agustus "Cip" Phillip (6 September 1936 – 16 September 2007) was a sprinter from Trinidad and Tobago. He was one of at least ten children. He lived in Christiansted, United States Virgin Islands, and died in Orlando, Florida. Phillip had two daughters, Erica and Yvette, and one son, Cipriani, Jr., a life partner, Lillian Troutman, and her two sons, Andy Troutman and Anthony St. Louis.

Achievements

External links 

 Cipriani Phillip at National Sporting Archive of Trinidad and Tobago

References

1936 births
2007 deaths
Athletes (track and field) at the 1963 Pan American Games
Athletes (track and field) at the 1966 British Empire and Commonwealth Games
Trinidad and Tobago male sprinters
Pan American Games medalists in athletics (track and field)
Pan American Games bronze medalists for Trinidad and Tobago
Medalists at the 1963 Pan American Games
Central American and Caribbean Games medalists in athletics
Commonwealth Games competitors for Trinidad and Tobago